Cleveland P Wade (born 29 April 1960, in Bermuda) is a former Bermudian cricketer. He was a right-handed batsman and right-arm medium pace bowler. He played in three List A matches for Bermuda in the 1996 Red Stripe Bowl. He also played for Bermuda in three ICC Trophy tournaments.

References

1960 births
Living people
Bermudian cricketers